Francisco Javier Piña Correa (born January 16, 1988) is a Chilean footballer who last played for Santiago Morning of the Primera B de Chile.

Titles
 Unión San Felipe 2009 Primera B de Chile and Copa Chile
 San Marcos de Arica 2012 Primera B de Chile

External links
 Profile at BDFA 
 

1988 births
Living people
People from El Loa Province
Chilean footballers
Cobreloa footballers
C.D. Arturo Fernández Vial footballers
Unión San Felipe footballers
Unión La Calera footballers
San Marcos de Arica footballers
Curicó Unido footballers
Deportes Temuco footballers
Santiago Wanderers footballers
Santiago Morning footballers
Chilean Primera División players
Primera B de Chile players
Segunda División Profesional de Chile players
Association football midfielders